Raul Ruiz (born August 25, 1972) is an American physician and politician serving as the U.S. representative for California's 25th congressional district. He is a member of the Democratic Party.

Born in Zacatecas City, Mexico, Ruiz grew up in Coachella, California. He was the first Latino to receive three graduate degrees from Harvard University, attending Harvard Medical School, the John F. Kennedy School of Government and Harvard School of Public Health. He worked as an emergency physician at the Eisenhower Medical Center in Rancho Mirage, California, before assisting humanitarian efforts in the aftermath of the 2010 Haiti earthquake. In what was considered a major upset, Ruiz defeated redistricted incumbent Republican U.S. Representative Mary Bono in the 2012 election with 52.9% of the vote. He was reelected in 2014 with 54.2% of the vote, after what was considered one of the most competitive congressional races in the country; in 2016 and 2018, he received about 60% of the vote.

Early life and education
Ruiz was born in Zacatecas City, Mexico, and raised in Coachella, California. His parents were farm workers. He graduated from Coachella Valley High School at age 17 and went to the University of California, Los Angeles (UCLA) in 1990, graduating magna cum laude before attending Harvard Medical School (HMS). He was the first Latino to receive three graduate degrees from Harvard University: a Doctor of Medicine (M.D.) from HMS, a Master of Public Policy (M.P.P.) from the John F. Kennedy School of Government and a Master of Public Health (M.P.H.) from the Harvard School of Public Health.

Medical career
After graduating from Harvard, Ruiz spent time working abroad in Mexico, El Salvador, and Serbia, and completed emergency medicine residency training at the University of Pittsburgh School of Medicine in 2006 before taking a job as an emergency physician at the Eisenhower Medical Center, a nonprofit hospital in the Coachella Valley. He founded the Coachella Valley Healthcare Initiative in 2010. In 2011, he became senior associate dean at the School of Medicine at University of California, Riverside.

In 2012, Ruiz received a Commander's Award for Public Service from the U.S. Army's 82nd Airborne Division for his humanitarian efforts for victims of the 2010 Haiti earthquake.

U.S. House of Representatives

Elections

2012 

The district had previously been the 45th, represented by 15-year incumbent Mary Bono Mack and previously by her late husband Sonny Bono. Ruiz was initially regarded as a long shot to win. He was endorsed by Bill Clinton in October 2012. The new district was significantly more Latino than its predecessor; Latinos now made up almost half its population. Ruiz appealed to them by running Spanish-language ads. He was elected with 52.9% of the vote to Bono Mack's 47.1%.

During the 2012 campaign, Bono Mack "accused Ruiz of being a far-left radical and repeatedly referred to Ruiz's 1997 arrest in Massachusetts while participating in a Thanksgiving Day protest against the treatment of American Indians." She stated that Ruiz "dressed in Aztec warrior colors", had taken part in these Thanksgiving Day protests for six years, and "encouraged people to smash Plymouth Rock." At a debate, Bono Mack asked "Dr. Ruiz, who are you?"

At an October 2012 press conference, Bono Mack campaign officials released an audiotape on which Ruiz expressed solidarity with convicted police murderer Mumia Abu-Jamal and read a letter of support for Leonard Peltier, who was convicted in 1977 of murdering two FBI agents in South Dakota. On the tape, supposedly recorded at a 1999 Thanksgiving rally, Ruiz read aloud a letter to Peltier from a Marxist leader, "Subcomandante Marcos." It read in part: "Leonard Peltier's most serious crime is that he seeks to rescue in the past, and in his culture, in his roots, the history of his people, the Lakota. And for the powerful, this is a crime, because knowing oneself with history impedes from being tossed around by this absurd machine that is in the system." A spokesman for Ruiz maintained that the candidate did not recall the incident and that he did not support Peltier.

"If the growing sway of Latinos in American politics was the story of election 2012", wrote Politico after the 2012 election, "Raul Ruiz's triumph in California's 36th congressional district was a dramatic subplot." Republicans "didn't seem to fully appreciate the district's fast-growing Hispanic population until it was too late." Ruiz told Politico that his victory was "a reflection of America." Upon taking office in January 2013, he became the first Democrat to represent this district since its creation in 1983 (it had been the 37th from 1983 to 1993, the 44th from 1993 to 2003, and the 45th from 2003 to 2013).

2014 

Ruiz competed in the top-two primary on June 3, finishing first with 50.3% of the vote. He then faced the Republican nominee, state assemblyman Brian Nestande, in the November 4 general election. Despite being considered one of the most vulnerable incumbent members of the House, Ruiz was reelected with 54.2% of the vote to Nestande's 45.8%.

2016 

Ruiz's 2016 campaign focused largely on his successful attempt to secure funds for the Salton Sea Red Hill Bay restoration project and his efforts on behalf of veterans.

Ruiz was elected to a third term in November, receiving 60% of the vote, over Republican state Senator Jeff Stone.

After winning, Ruiz spoke critically about "the politics of fear" and "hateful rhetoric." Addressing his supporters in Rancho Mirage, he said, "I believe that we need to come together as a nation. I believe we need to heal our wounds and put people above partisanship and solutions above ideology."

2018 

In October 2017, soap-opera actress Kimberlin Brown, a pro-Trump Republican, announced that she would challenge Ruiz in 2018. Criticizing Ruiz for not passing any "meaningful" legislation, Brown said, "For the first time in the history of our great country, we are not leaving something better behind for the next generation." Brown, known for The Bold and the Beautiful, runs a design firm and has co-managed an avocado farm with her husband.

Ruiz was reelected with 59% of the vote.

2020 

Ruiz was reelected, defeating Republican challenger Erin Cruz, an author and a candidate for the United States Senate in 2018, with 60.3% of the vote.

Tenure

Manufacturing jobs
In April 2013, Ruiz introduced his first bill, the SelectUSA Authorization Act of 2013. The bill would incentivize international corporations to invest in creating manufacturing jobs in the United States rather than overseas. As of 2014, it had not been voted on by the House.

CISPA
In April 2013, Ruiz voted for CISPA, which would allow for the sharing of Internet traffic information between the U.S. government and technology and manufacturing companies.

Health care
Ruiz has said he approaches the job of congressman "through the lens of a scientist, viewing gun control and other controversial issues from a public health perspective."

In May 2013, Ruiz voted against repeal of the Patient Protection and Affordable Care Act. During his 2012 campaign, he stated his support for the Affordable Care Act.

In 2014, Ruiz voted against the Pain-Capable Unborn Child Protection Act, which would ban abortions 20 or more weeks after fertilization.

In 2017, Ruiz called Obamacare "a giant step in the right direction" while acknowledging that "it is imperfect and needs to be improved." He maintained that the GOP plan would "make premiums and deductibles go up even higher, 24 million will be uninsured...and there will be reduced reimbursement rates to hospitals and doctors for patients on Medicaid...There's nothing to reduce health care costs and out-of-pocket payments." Ruiz said that Obamacare represented "one of the largest improvements in covering Latinos with health insurance."

Iran deal
Ruiz supported the Iran nuclear deal. In a press release, he wrote: "I have come to a conclusion that approving this agreement is the most effective realistic diplomatic option to prevent Iran from obtaining a nuclear weapon, and therefore, in the best interest of our nation and allies. From the start, I committed myself to a rigorous, evidence-based approach without consideration of partisanship or politics. I spent many hours soliciting opinions from supporters and opponents. I will vote for the Iran agreement, but I make this decision with great humility and appreciation of the risks. I am confident that I reached this conclusion because I believe that the hard evidence indicates it is in America’s best interest. At the same time, I appreciate and respect the many individuals who looked within, considered the alternatives, and reached the opposite conclusion."

Syrian refugees
On November 19, 2015, Ruiz voted for HR 4038, legislation that would effectively halt the resettlement of refugees from Syria and Iraq to the United States.

Committee assignments
 The House Energy and Commerce Subcommittee on Environment
 The House Energy and Commerce Subcommittee on Communications and Technology
 The House Energy and Commerce Subcommittee on Oversight and Investigations

Caucus memberships
 Congressional Hispanic Caucus
New Democrat Coalition

Political positions

Abortion

Ruiz has a 100% rating from NARAL Pro-Choice America and an F rating from the Susan B. Anthony List for his abortion-related voting record. He opposed the overturning of Roe v. Wade.

Personal life
Ruiz is married to Monica Rivers, an emergency room nurse. He proposed to her at Joshua Tree National Park in December 2013. They married in May 2014 in the Coachella Valley. Their twin daughters were born in March 2015. He is a member of the Seventh-day Adventist Church. Ruiz and his family live in Palm Desert.

See also

List of Hispanic and Latino Americans in the United States Congress
Physicians in US Congress

References

External links

Congressman Raul Ruiz official U.S. House website
Raul Ruiz for Congress campaign website
 
 

|-

|-

|-

1972 births
21st-century American politicians
American politicians of Mexican descent
American Seventh-day Adventists
Harvard Medical School alumni
Harvard School of Public Health alumni
Hispanic and Latino American members of the United States Congress
Harvard Kennedy School alumni
Living people
Democratic Party members of the United States House of Representatives from California
Mexican emigrants to the United States
People from Coachella, California
Physicians from California
University of California, Los Angeles alumni
University of California, Riverside faculty